Ephesto (born June 10, 1965) is a Mexican luchador enmascarado (Spanish for "masked professional wrestler"). Ephesto's real name has not been officially documented, a tradition in Mexican lucha libre where masked wrestlers' real names often are not a matter of public record. The wrestler currently known as Ephesto made his debut in 1982 and worked for almost 20 years as Pantera del Ring with limited success. He later worked under the name Safari where he won the Mexican National Trios Championship on two occasions.

His current ring name "Ephesto" is derived from the Spanish name for Hephaestus, the Greek god of fire, Hefesto; in fact, his name is sometimes spelled Hefesto in print sources. Ephesto is a founding member of the stable Los Hijos del Infierno (Spanish for the Sons of the Inferno) with Averno and Mephisto. Ephesto is a former CMLL World Light Heavyweight Champion, Mexican National Trios Champion, and CMLL World Trios Champion.

Professional wrestling career
The wrestler later known as Ephesto made his debut in 1982 at the age of 16, after being trained by  Halco Suriano, Asterión, El Satánico and Blue Panther. His first ring persona was Pantera del Ring (Spanish for the Panther of the Ring), a masked luchador character (or enmascarado) with a panther inspired mask and trunks, in part as an homage to his trainer Blue Panther. As Pantera del Ring, sometimes referred to as "Panterita del Ring" ("Little Panther of the ring"), he signed with Consejo Mundial de Lucha Libre (CMLL; "World Wrestling Council") in the early 1990s and began working as a low card tecnicó (the Lucha Libre term for a "Good guy"). When Antonio Peña, the head booker of CMLL at the time broke off to form the rival wrestling company Asistencia Asesoría y Administración (AAA), Pantera del Ring was one of the CMLL workers that left CMLL to follow  Peña in 1992. In AAA he teamed up with Latin Lover to win the Mexican National Tag Team Championship from the team of Fuerza and Juventud Guerrera on June 1, 1995. The team only held the tag team titles for three and a half months before losing them back to the Guerrera family. By 1997.. Panterita del Ring was working for the newly formed Promo Azteca promotion, this time as a rudo (the Lucha Libre term for "bad guy"). He won the tournament to crown the first ever Aztecas Middleweight Champion defeating Ángel Azteca and Black Dragon in the finals. He eventually lost the title but kept working for Promo Azteca as an upper card worker until Promo Azteca folded in the late 1990s.

In 2000, he returned to CMLL and began working under the ring persona Safari, a mid-level tecnicó. Safari did not gain much momentum, generally working random tag matches until he was teamed up with Mr. Niebla and Olímpico and defeated the team of Blue Panther, Fuerza Guerrera and El Signo to win the Mexican National Trios Championship on March 30, 2001. The team had a rather uneventful title reign that lasted 15 months but rarely saw the team defended the title until Los Nuevos Infernales (Averno, Mephisto and El Satánico) won the titles from them on June 23, 2001. In late 2003, Safari teamed up with El Felino and Volador Jr. to win a tournament for the vacant Mexican National Trios Championship, defeating Alan Stone, Super Crazy, and Zumbido in a tournament final to claim the title. Safari's second run with the title proved to be about as long as the first one, 16 months, but once again did not result in many memorable matches or a sustained push for Safari. When Pandilla Guerrera ("Gang of Warriors"; Doctor X, Nitro, and Sangre Azteca) defeated Safari's team for the titles it signaled the last time the Safari character was given the spotlight.

In late 2005, only months after losing the trios titles Safari transitioned into working as El Hombre sin Nombre (Spanish for "The Man without name"), a ring persona and name that indicates that the wrestler is a "blank slate", as he has no name and wrestles in plain black trunks and mask. CMLL started a contest for the fans to come up with a new name and ring persona for this wrestler. As Hombre sin Nombre he worked as a Rudo with no public reference given to the fact that he was previously known as Safari. By the end of 2007, it was announced that El Hombre Sin Nombre finally had a name, Ephesto as suggested by a fan, named after the Greek God of fire Hephaestus.

Ephesto (2007–present)
Along with the new name came a new look, dressing mainly in black with a mask with a ram's horn design and a new group of allies. Ephesto joined forces with Averno and Mephisto to form the stable La Triada del Terror (Spanish for the Trio of Terror), and although he was considered the low man in the group associating with two of CMLL's top Rudo acts meant he got more exposure as Ephesto than he ever did as Safari or El Hombre Sin Nombre. When Averno and Mephisto formed Los Hijos del Averno (Spanish for the Sons of Hell) Ephesto was one of the first to join up with them. In late 2008, Ephesto received a couple of shots at La Sombra's NWA World Welterweight Championship, his first chance at a singles title in CMLL. While he did not win the title the matches with La Sombra were very competitive and well received. In mid-2009 Ephesto began targeting rival Rey Bucanero, challenging him for the CMLL World Light Heavyweight Championship. At first the storyline between the two saw Rey Bucanero turn down the challenge, only to later accept after Ephesto brought a ringside ticket for a show where Bucanero was in the main event and interfered in the match. On May 26, the two met with the title on the line, after each winning one fall the match was stopped by the referee as Rey Bucanero had suffered a serious knee injury. The referee awarded the match and the title to Ephesto, his first CMLL singles title.

By virtue of holding the CMLL World Light Heavyweight Championship Ephesto participated in the 2010 Universal Championship tournament. He was part of "Block A" that competed on the July 30, 2010, Super Viernes show. He co-won the eight-man seeding battle royal, but was eliminated from the tournament when he lost to El Texano, Jr. in the first round of the actual tournament. On August 16, 2010, it was announced that Ephesto was one of 14 men putting their mask on the line in a Luchas de Apuestas steel cage match, the main event of the CMLL 77th Anniversary Show. Ephesto was the third man to leave the steel cage as all three members of Los Hijos del Averno quickly left the cage keeping their masks safe. The match came down to La Sombra pinning Olímpico to unmask him. On February 22, 2011, Ephesto lost the CMLL World Light Heavyweight Championship to Rush, ending his reign at 637 days.

On July 15, Los Hijos del Averno defeated La Generación Dorada (Máscara Dorada, La Máscara and La Sombra) to win the CMLL World Trios Championship. They would lose the title to El Bufete del Amor (Marco Corleone, Máximo and Rush) on February 19, 2012. In March 2013, Ephesto was paired up with tecnicó wrestler for the 2013 Torneo Nacional de Parejas Increibles ("National Incredible Pairs Tournament") a tag team tournament where the concept was that rivals would be forced to work together to win the tournament. While the two managed to work together they still lost their first round match to the team of Diamante Azul and Euforia. On August 9, 2015, Los Hijos del Infierno defeated Los Reyes de la Atlantida ("The Kings of the Atlantis"; Atlantis, Delta and Guerrero Maya Jr.) to win the Mexican National Trios Championship, Ephesto's third trios title reign but the first under the "Ephesto" ring character. With the championship victory, Ephesto was eligible for the 2015 Universal Championship, where he was defeated by his tag team partner Mephisto. During Los Hijos del Infierno's championship reign they successfully defended the championship against both tecnicó trios (such as Ángel de Oro, Dragon Lee and Stuka Jr.) and rudo teams (such as Los Invasores; Olímpico, Kraneo and Ripper). In the 2016 Universal Championship tournament Ephesto was eliminated in the first round by La Máscara. In late 2016 Ephesto started a storyline rivalry with Guerrero Maya Jr. as the two found themselves on opposite sides in various six-man tag team matches. As the rivalry grew news outlest began speculating on if the two would put their masks on the line in a Lucha de Apuestas match. In January 2017, Ephesto made his Japanese debut by taking part in Fantastica Mania 2017, the annual tour co-produced by CMLL and New Japan Pro-Wrestling (NJPW).

Personal life
Ephesto's brother, Jesús Parra Ramírez, also works for CMLL under the name "Lucifierno" and has previously worked under ring names such as Hooligan, El Hombre Sin Nombre (years after Ephesto used the same name) and Último Rebelde. For years there was a common misconception among lucha libre fans that Ephesto, Último Guerrero, and Hooligan were all brothers. All three come from the "Lagunero" area in Mexico and early in their professional wrestling career, the three stuck together to try to break into wrestling. This shared experience caused them to sometimes refer to each other as "Brother" even though no familiar relationship exists between Último Guerrero and the Parra brothers. Ephesto's nephew made his CMLL debut in 2014 under the name "El Rebelde".

Championships and accomplishments
Asistencia Asesoría y Administración
Mexican National Tag Team Championship (1 time) – with Latin Lover
Consejo Mundial de Lucha Libre
CMLL World Light Heavyweight Championship (1 time)
CMLL World Trios Championship (1 time) – with Averno and Mephisto
Mexican National Trios Championship (3 times) – with Olimpico and Mr. Niebla (1), and Volador Jr. and El Felino (1), Lucifierno and Mephisto (1)
Promo Azteca
Aztecas Middleweight Championship (1 time)
Pro Wrestling Illustrated
PWI ranked him #152 of the 500 best singles wrestlers of the PWI 500 in 2007

Luchas de Apuestas record

References

1965 births
Living people
Masked wrestlers
Mexican male professional wrestlers
Unidentified wrestlers
Professional wrestlers from Durango
People from Gómez Palacio, Durango
20th-century professional wrestlers
21st-century professional wrestlers
Mexican National Tag Team Champions
Mexican National Trios Champions
CMLL World Light Heavyweight Champions
CMLL World Trios Champions